Tamme may refer to:

Places in Estonia
Tamme, Pärnu County, village in Lääneranna Parish, Pärnu County
Tamme, Tartu County, village in Elva Parish, Tartu County
Tamme, Võru County, village in Võru Parish, Võru County
Tammelinn, neighbourhood in Tartu
Kabala, Rapla County (formerly known as Tamme), village in Rapla Parish, Rapla County

People with the surname
Ants Tamme (born 1940), Estonian politician and journalist
Heidy Tamme (born 1943), Estonian singer
Jacob Tamme (born 1985), American football player
Villu Tamme (born 1963), Estonian punk musician (J.M.K.E.)

Other uses
Tamme Stadium, stadium in Tartu, Estonia

See also
Tamm (disambiguation)

Estonian-language surnames